Nuno Miguel Araújo Pinheiro (born 31 December 1984 in Espinho) is a professional volleyballer who plays for S.L. Benfica as a setter.

Pinheiro was recruited to the Portugal men's national team in May 2002 and represented the country until 2015. In 2005, he played for Portugal at the World Cup qualifying tournament in Varna and in the European Championships in Italy.

Between 2005 and July 2009, Pinheiro played for Noliko Maaseik in Belgium, with whom he won two championships, one Cup and two Super Cups.

Pinheiro became Best Setter at the second 2008 Olympic Qualification Tournament in Espinho, where Portugal ended up in second place and missed qualification for the 2008 Summer Olympics in Beijing, China.

Honours
Benfica
Portuguese First Division: 2018–19
Portuguese Cup: 2018–19
Portuguese Super Cup: 2018, 2019

References

External links
 FIVB Profile

1984 births
Living people
People from Espinho, Portugal
Portuguese men's volleyball players
S.L. Benfica volleyball players
Sportspeople from Aveiro District
Tours Volley-Ball players